Zazzo is a surname. Notable people with the surname include:

 Lawrence Zazzo (born 1970), American countertenor
 René Zazzo (1910–1995), French psychologist and pedagogue

See also
 Zazzau
 Zizzo